KRLD-FM ("105.3 The Fan") is a commercial radio station licensed to Dallas, Texas, and serving the Dallas/Fort Worth Metroplex. KRLD-FM is owned by Audacy, Inc., and airs a sports radio format. The station's studios and offices are located along North Central Expressway in Uptown Dallas, and the transmitter site is in Cedar Hill.

The station airs local sports talk shows most of the day and evening, and carries nationally syndicated programming from CBS Sports Radio during the late night and overnight hours. KRLD-FM is the flagship station of the Dallas Cowboys Radio Network and the Texas Rangers Radio Network. Some early hours on weekends are paid brokered programming. In the sports radio format, KRLD-FM's chief rival is Sportsradio 1310/96.7 The Ticket.

KRLD-FM broadcasts in HD Radio. It carries the all-news/talk format of its sister station 1080 KRLD on its HD 2 subchannel. Its HD 3 subchannel is devoted to coverage of the Dallas Cowboys football team, with additional programming from the CBS Sports Radio.

History
105.3 FM went on the air in January 1958 with a classical music format, using the call sign KSFM. In 1960, the station went dark and then resurfaced with an automated beautiful music format as KPSD, only to sign-off again by the end of the year. Century Broadcasting purchased the dark KPSD in 1962 and returned it to the air as KMAP, "The Sound of Success", featuring classical music and later, Broadway show tunes. In 1968, Century sold KMAP to Dawson Communications, which changed the call letters to KXXK and the format to MOR music.

KXXK became KOAX ("Coax") in 1971, returning to the beautiful music format. Through the 1970s and into the early 1980s, KOAX was one of the most popular FM stations in Dallas/Fort Worth, consistently scoring top 10 ratings. But by 1985, its ratings were falling, and KOAX changed its call sign to KQZY ("Cozy 105.3") that year, evolving the format from beautiful music to soft adult contemporary. KQZY changed format to hot AC as "Star 105.3" in September 1989, taking the new call sign KRSR the following summer. "Star" featured such personalities as Bob Nelson, John McCarty, Teri Richardson, Mike Sheppard, Stoobie Doak and Scott Carpenter, who also served as program director. Ratings remained low, and on January 27, 1992, following a 2-day electronic countdown, Alliance Broadcasting (based in Walnut Creek, California) launched the very first "Young Country" station on 105.3 FM with the station temporarily taking the call sign KRRM before becoming KYNG in February. The format featured current-heavy country music aimed toward a younger audience, and created "morning shows" all day that highlighted listener calls, frequent requests and fun disc jockey talk. It was all a part of owner Alliance's "Young Country" concept, repeated in other media markets around the country. Throughout the country format's tenure, its marketing brand was "Young Country 105.3, FM 105".

KYNG was one of four stations (the others being KXTX-TV, and sister stations KOAI and KRBV) that fell victim to the Cedar Hill tower collapse on October 12, 1996. Three workers were killed, and one worker was injured when a gust of wind caught the gin pole being used for construction of a new antenna for KXTX.  After the collapse, the stations scrambled to get back on air and later ended up using an auxiliary site for many months, though at a much reduced power output. Because of this, KYNG's ratings plummeted.

After being acquired by Infinity Broadcasting (the forerunner to CBS Radio), KYNG changed format from country music to a combination of hot talk and active rock music on April 3, 2000. The final song on "Young Country" was "The Dance" by Garth Brooks. The station's first moniker under the new format was "105.3 The Talk That Rocks". KYNG became the Dallas network affiliate for The Howard Stern Show; other personalities and programs during its initial launch included Ed Tyll, A.W. Pantoja, Jim Verdi, Martha Martinez, Russ Martin, Tom Leykis, Loveline, and John & Jeff. Three years later, in March 2003, the station took the new call sign KLLI, with "Live 105.3" as the new name and the slogan "The Alternative Talk Station". In late 2005, as part of the station's change in morning shows (due to Stern leaving CBS Radio to go to Sirius Satellite Radio in early 2006), KLLI dropped the "Alternative Talk Station" slogan and started using the CBS Radio nationwide slogan for FM talk, "Free FM". In May 2007, as part of CBS Radio's phasing out of the Free FM name and slogan, KLLI dropped the "Free FM" slogan and was again simply known as "Live 105.3". By this time, the weekday lineup consisted of Chris Jagger, Pugs Moran & Kelly Mohr, Russ Martin, Tom Leykis, "Big" Dick Hunter, and Loveline.

On December 8, 2008, at 3 p.m., KLLI switched to a sports talk format, branded as "105.3 The Fan". This change was not a complete overhaul as some hosts, notably morning host Jagger and some of his morning crew, survived the shift, while others, including Russ Martin, were not retained. On December 12, 2008, the call sign was changed to KRLD-FM to match sister station 1080 KRLD (AM). Eventually, the programming became all sports. Some of the early shows included The Josh and Elf Show (hosted by Josh Lewin and Mark Elfenbein), RAGE (Richie and Greggo Extravaganza hosted by Richie Whitt and Greg Williams), and The Arnie Spanier Show.

On May 21, 2012, CBS Radio hinted at a possible format flip for either KRLD-FM or KMVK to "AMP Radio", much like its co-owned Los Angeles contemporary hit radio station KAMP-FM, as CBS registered three web domains, but neither station changed to that format.

On February 2, 2017, CBS Radio announced it would merge with Entercom (now known as Audacy). The merger was approved on November 9, 2017, and was consummated on November 17.

Months after on April 26, 2018, Entercom struck a new content deal with NBCUniversal-owned-and-operated stations KXAS-TV (NBC) and KXTX-TV (Telemundo). The former will be partnered with this station to bring enhanced local sports news and scores to its audience.

HD radio
105.3 HD-2 was originally launched in 2005 as a Spanish version of their "Live/Free FM" format. In 2008, the HD-2 channel shifted to an Indie Rock-formatted playlist from internet radio station The Indie-Verse via a secured internet feed. In June 2009, The Indie-Verse was dumped in favor of the simulcast of KRLD NewsRadio 1080 AM. The reason was because of the new Microsoft Zune player's feature which allowed listeners to hear HD stations as well as MP3 files, but wouldn't be able to tune into AM stations. 105.3 HD-3 airs an all-"Dallas Cowboys Radio" format, which carries archived football games and talk shows about the Cowboys, with the overnight hours occupied by CBS Sports Radio.

Notable on-air staff

Current 
 Mike Bacsik

Former 
 Josh Lewin
 Jane Slater

Play-by-play rights

NASCAR
KRLD-FM is the flagship station for Texas Motor Speedway and carries NASCAR Cup Series races.

Dallas Cowboys
KRLD-FM has been the flagship station for the Dallas Cowboys National Football League team since the 2009 season. The deal revived the long association the Cowboys had with KRLD (AM) in the 1970s and 1980s. It features regular appearances by team owner Jerry Jones and head coach Mike McCarthy.

Texas Rangers
The Texas Rangers of Major League Baseball aired their games from Monday through Friday on 105.3 The Fan in the 2009 and 2010 seasons (the latter was their pennant-winning year). Weekend games were still on KRLD NewsRadio 1080. After that season, the Rangers did not renew the contract. Games from 2011 to 2014 were on rival station 103.3 ESPN in English and on 1540 KZMP in Spanish, which continued with Spanish-language rights until ESPN Deportes Radio's demise, in which they were moved to another Spanish sports station KFLC 1270 AM. Rangers games (including weekends) returned to 105.3 The Fan starting in the 2015 season.

History of call letters
The call letters KRLD-FM were originally assigned to a Dallas station that began broadcasting March 21, 1948. As only the third FM station in Dallas, it broadcast on 92.5 MHz with 50 kW power. The licensee was KRLD Radio Corporation, which also owned 1080 KRLD. The call letters were retired in 1972, when the station became KAFM (and today is KZPS). CBS Radio took the KRLD-FM call sign for 105.3 in 2008.

References

External links

 DFW Radio Archives
 DFW Radio/TV History

Sports radio stations in the United States
Radio stations established in 1958
RLD-FM
1958 establishments in Texas
CBS Sports Radio stations
Audacy, Inc. radio stations